Kinef-Surgutneftegaz is a Russian men's and women's water polo club from Kirishi owned by Kinef and Surgutneftegaz.

The women's club was founded in the 1993–94 season as Fakel. In the 1996–97 season the club was renamed Kinef. Since 2003, receiving its current name Kinef-Surgutneftegaz, the Russian club emerged in the mid-2000s as the leading team in Russia, dominating the Russian Championship in subsequent years. Most recently it was won its nineteenth title in a row  and qualified for the 2012 European Cup's final four.

Titles (women's team)
 Euroleague
 Champion (2): 2017, 2018
 Runner up (5): 2005, 2006, 2007, 2010, 2013
 LEN Trophy (1)
 2021
 Russian Championship (19)
 2003, 2004, 2005, 2006, 2007, 2008, 2009, 2010, 2011, 2012, 2013, 2014, 2015, 2016, 2017, 2018, 2019, 2020, 2021

References

External links
Official website

Water polo clubs in Russia
Sport in Leningrad Oblast
LEN Women's Champions' Cup clubs